Air Power, Insurgency and the "War on Terror" is a 2009 non-fiction book on airpower (military aviation) edited by British-New Zealand scholar Joel Hayward.

Summary
Hayward has assembled a team of authoritative analysts on the use of airpower during the so-called War on terror, meaning the counterinsurgencies in Afghanistan and Iraq in the 2000s. The book goes further by analyzing the development of the ideas and practices of using air power in counterinsurgency and other asymmetrical roles.

Reviews
A review in The Journal of Military History stated: "Joel Hayward's edited work, Air Power, Insurgency and the "War on Terror", successfully presents the foundations of air power's historical, contemporary, and moral relationships to irregular warfare. ... I strongly recommend this work to better understand the characteristics of the relationship between air power and irregular warfare. [It] provides thought provoking reading, while the collection of papers provides much needed critical thinking about the relationship of air power to meet the challenges of conducting counter-insurgent operations within the context of irregular warfare and terrorism."

References 

2006 non-fiction books
Aviation books
Aerial warfare strategy
Books about military history
Military strategy books
English non-fiction books
Books by Joel Hayward